Bentak is a railway station in Irun, Basque Country, Spain. It is owned by Euskal Trenbide Sarea and operated by Euskotren. It lies on the San Sebastián-Hendaye railway, popularly known as the Topo line. The Cercanías San Sebastián station  is located adjacent to the Euskotren station.

History 
The station opened in 1912 as part of the San Sebastián-Hendaye railway. The access to the station, which previously involved walking along the shoulder of a road, was improved in 2018.

Services 
The station is served by Euskotren Trena line E2. It runs every 15 minutes during weekdays and weekend afternoons, and every 30 minutes on weekend mornings.

References

External links
 

Euskotren Trena stations
Railway stations in Gipuzkoa
Railway stations in Spain opened in 1912
Irun